Raymond Leroy "Sugar" Evans (January 10, 1924 – April 25, 2008) was an American football lineman who played at the guard and tackle positions.

A native of Electra, Texas, he attended Odessa Hills High School and played college football for the Texas Mines Miners. He began his college career in 1942 as a fullback, but he then served  in the Seabees during World War II. He returned to the college after the war, moved to the line, and won all-conference honors in 1947 and again in 1948. At the end the 1948 season, he was selected by the conference coaches as the Border Conference lineman of the year.

Evans initially signed to play professional football with the Cleveland Browns but was waived by the Browns at the end of August 1949. He was then sold to the San Francisco 49ers in early September 1949.  He played for the 49ers during the 1949 and 1950 seasons, appearing in 22 NFL games.

Evans died in 2008 at Salem, Oregon.

References

1924 births
2008 deaths
San Francisco 49ers players
UTEP Miners football players
Players of American football from Texas
People from Electra, Texas